Rafael Rotter (born June 14, 1987) is an Austrian professional ice hockey forward. He is currently playing for the Vienna Capitals of the ICE Hockey League (ICEHL). On April 30, 2015, in marking his eight year with the club, Rotter was signed to a two-year contract extension with the Capitals.

Rotter participated at the 2011 IIHF World Championship as a member of the Austria men's national ice hockey team.

Awards and honours

References

External links

1987 births
Living people
Austrian ice hockey forwards
EHC Black Wings Linz players
EC Red Bull Salzburg players
Guelph Storm players
Vienna Capitals players
Ice hockey people from Vienna